Britany Miller (born August 10, 1987) is an American basketball player. She played college basketball for Florida State before going on to play professionally with the Detroit Shock in the WNBA.

Florida State statistics
Source

References

External links
Profile at Eurobasket.com

1987 births
Living people
American women's basketball players
Detroit Shock players
Florida State Seminoles women's basketball players
Place of birth missing (living people)
Centers (basketball)